
Year 342 (CCCXLII) was a common year starting on Friday (link will display the full calendar) of the Julian calendar. At the time, it was known as the Year of the Consulship of Constantius and Claudius (or, less frequently, year 1095 Ab urbe condita). The denomination 342 for this year has been used since the early medieval period, when the Anno Domini calendar era became the prevalent method in Europe for naming years.

Events 
 By place 

 Roman Empire 
 Emperor Constans I campaigns in Britain against the Picts.
 Constans campaigns victoriously against the Franks.
 The Senate abolishes gay marriage.

 Europe 
 A large earthquake strikes Cyprus.

 Asia 
 Goguryeo is invaded by Murong Huang of the Xianbei.
 Jin Kangdi succeeds his brother Jin Chengdi as emperor of China.

 By topic 

 Religion 
 Paul I, Patriarch of Constantinople, is deposed and replaced by Macedonius I.
 February 15 – The original Hagia Sophia is dedicated in Constantinople.

Births 
 Fei of Jin (or Sima Yi), Chinese emperor (d. 386)

Deaths 
 July 26 – Chen of Jin (or Sima Yan), Chinese emperor (b. 321)
 Barsabias, Christian abbot, missionary and martyr
 Paul of Thebes, Christian hermit (approximate date)
 Tiberius Julius Rhescuporis VI, Roman client king

References